Blake Pouliot (born January 31, 1994) is a Canadian-born professional classical violinist. He studied at The Royal Conservatory of Music in Toronto and the Colburn School in Los Angeles. His debut CD was nominated for a 2019 Canadian Classical Music Juno Award and he is currently represented worldwide by Opus 3 Artists in New York City. Pouliot is known for his brilliant artistry and somewhat outlandish concert clothing. Pouliot is currently Orchestre Métropolitain's Soloist-in-Residence under the guidance of musical director and Principal Conductor Yannick Nézet-Séguin.

Early life and education
Pouliot was born in Toronto, Canada. At age seven he began violin, piano and theory lessons at The Royal Conservatory of Music in Toronto.

During his schooling years he was a member of a local string quartet and pop rock group and he served as Concertmaster of the Toronto Symphony Youth Orchestra, the National Youth Orchestra of Canada, and the Youth Orchestra of the Americas.

Pre-college he studied violin in Toronto with Marie Berard and Erika Raum before completing his Graduate Violin Performance Diploma at the Colburn School Conservatory of Music in Los Angeles, under the tutorage of violinist Robert Lipsett.

Career

At age eleven Pouliot made his orchestral solo debut with the Trinity Strings Orchestra of Toronto. This was followed by solo performances with orchestras including the Aspen Philharmonic Orchestra, Montreal Symphony Orchestra, National Arts Center Orchestra, Pacific Symphony, Sofia Philharmonic Orchestra, Toronto Symphony Orchestra, Vancouver Symphony Orchestra, and the Colburn Orchestra. He has performed under the baton of conductors including Sir Neville Marriner,<ref>Richard S. Ginell, "Ageless Neville Marriner leads Colburne Orchestra", Los Angeles Times', (Jan 19, 2015), https://www.latimes.com/entertainment/arts/culture/la-et-cm-neville-marriner-and-the-colburn-orchestra-at-walt-disney-concert-hall-20150119-story.html</ref> Nicolas McGegan, Vasily Petrenko, Carl St. Clair, Alain Trudel, and Hugh Wolff, and has shared the stage with a wide variety of diverse artists including Yo Yo Ma and Diana Ross.

Pouliot has been featured on radio broadcasts including CBC Radio and served as Minnesota Public Radio's Performance Today's "Young Artist-in-Residence."

His 2018–2019 season included debut concerto performances with the Detroit, Dallas, Milwaukee, San Francisco, and Seattle Symphony Orchestras.

The same year he also recorded his first album with pianist Hsin-I Huang under the Analekta Records label.'' Featuring both the Ravel Violin Sonata No. 2 in G and the Debussy Violin Sonata in G Minor, the debut disc was nominated for the 2019 "Best Classical Album Solo/Chamber Ensemble' Juno Award — widely regarded as Canada’s equivalent to America's GRAMMY Awards or Great Britain's Brit Awards.

Pouliot currently serves as Orchestra Metropolitain's Soloist-In-Residence, in Montreal, under the mentorship of Musical Director and Principal Conductor Yannick Nézet-Séguin.

He is currently represented for worldwide management by Scott Mellow and Patricia Winter at Opus 3 Artists in New York.

Awards
Pouliot's accolades include the Grand Prize at the Orchestre Symphonique de Montréal (OSM) Manulife Competition, the Dorothy Delay Aspen Festival Prize, the Grand Prize at the Canadian Federation of Music Festivals, and the Canada Council for the Arts Michael Measures and Virginia Parker Prizes.

As the top honoree at the 2015 and the 2018 Canada Council of the Arts Musical Instrument Bank Competition, he was awarded the six year loan of a 1729 Guarneri del Gesu violin — previously performed on by fellow Canadian countrymen, Timothy Chooi and Nikki Chooi.

Personal life
Pouliot lives in Los Angeles and is a self confessed super fan of iconic jazz singer Ella Fitzgerald.

He has twice been featured on CBC’s "30 Hot Canadian Classical Musicians under 30" list.

He is known for the bright colored ‘rock star’ clothing which he often enjoys wearing on stage during performances. "Pouliot likes a splash of color or sequins in his on-stage wardrobe, something less traditional than the black suit and tie," CBC Canada noted recently.

"I really like trying to do something that's not too distasteful, but maybe a little bit different. I like to be a little more outlandish than what most classical music fans are used to," the violinist has said. "I have not had any real negative reactions and I am very fortunate to grow up in an age where being experimental has become more socially acceptable."

"Pouliot is a breath of fresh air in the historically conservative world of classical music. Outspoken and a flashy dresser, Pouliot thinks outside the box," Richard Burnett from Fugues Magazine recently wrote.

Pouliot also appeared in two short movies in acting roles, performed in a television series, and played a private recital for the former Prime Minister of Canada, Stephen Harper.

He is also an accomplished pianist, having taken piano lessons at The Royal Conservatory of Music in Toronto up until the end of his high schooling.

References

External links
 

1994 births
Living people
Canadian classical violinists
Musicians from Toronto
The Royal Conservatory of Music alumni
Colburn School alumni
Canadian expatriates in the United States
21st-century Canadian violinists and fiddlers
Canadian male violinists and fiddlers